Creteus is a genus of skippers in the family Hesperiidae. It contains only one species, Creteus cyrina, which is found in Asia, including India, Thailand and Brunei.

References

External links
Natural History Museum Lepidoptera genus database

Erionotini
Butterflies of Indochina
Monotypic butterfly genera
Hesperiidae genera
Taxa named by Lionel de Nicéville